Aisha (also ,) was Muhammad's third and youngest wife. In Islamic writings, her name is thus often prefixed by the title "Mother of the Believers", referring to the description of Muhammad's wives in the Qur'an.

Little is known about the early life of Aisha. A preponderance of classical sources converge on Aisha being six or seven years old at the time of her marriage, and nine at the consummation; her age has become a source of ideological friction in modern times. Aisha had an important role in early Islamic history, both during Muhammad's life and after his death. In Sunni tradition, Aisha is portrayed as scholarly and inquisitive. She contributed to the spread of Muhammad's message and served the Muslim community for 44 years after his death. She is also known for narrating 2,210 hadiths, not just on matters related to Muhammad's private life, but also on topics such as inheritance, pilgrimage, and eschatology. Her intellect and knowledge in various subjects, including poetry and medicine, were highly praised by early luminaries such as al-Zuhri and her student Urwa ibn al-Zubayr.

Her father, Abu Bakr, became the first caliph to succeed Muhammad, and after two years was succeeded by Umar. During the time of the third caliph Uthman, Aisha had a leading part in the opposition that grew against him, though she did not agree either with those responsible for his assassination or with the party of Ali. During the reign of Ali, she wanted to avenge Uthman's death, which she attempted to do in the Battle of the Camel. She participated in the battle by giving speeches and leading troops on the back of her camel. She ended up losing the battle, but her involvement and determination left a lasting impression. Because of her involvement in this battle, Shia Muslims have a generally negative view of Aisha. Afterward, she lived quietly in Medina for more than twenty years, took no part in politics, became reconciled to Ali and did not oppose caliph Mu'awiya.

Sources
Biographical information on Muhammad and his companions are recorded in hadiths and sira. Hadiths were initially narrated orally before being collected and compiled by Hadith scholars. In Islam, hadiths are regarded as fundamental sources second only to the Quran. However, the historical reliability of both hadith and sira has been a topic of debate among some academic circles.

Early life
Aisha was born in Mecca . She was the daughter of Abu Bakr and Umm Ruman, two of Muhammad's most trusted companions. No sources offer much more information about Aisha's childhood years.

Marriage to Muhammad
The idea to match Aisha with Muhammad was suggested by Khawlah bint Hakim after the death of Muhammad's first wife, Khadija bint Khuwaylid. After this, the previous agreement regarding the marriage of Aisha with Jubayr ibn Mut'im was put aside by common consent. Abu Bakr was uncertain at first "as to the propriety or even legality of marrying his daughter to his 'brother'." Muhammad responded that they were brothers only in religion. Orientalist William Montgomery Watt suggests that Muhammad hoped to strengthen his ties with Abu Bakr; the strengthening of ties commonly served as a basis for marriage in Arabian culture. 

All extant hadiths agree that Aisha was married to Muhammad in Mecca but the marriage was consummated only in the month of Shawwal after his hijrah to Medina (April 623). Some classical sources have Aisha speak of the marriage to have been executed in Medina itself without referencing to any delay.

Age at time of marriage

Islamic sources of the classical era list Aisha's age at the time of her marriage as six or seven and nine or ten at its consummation. In a hadith from Sahih al-Bukhari, Aisha recollects having been married at six years of age. Ibn Sa'd's biography holds her age at the time of marriage as between six and seven, and gives her age at consummation to be nine while Ibn Hisham's biography of Muhammad suggests she may have been ten years old at consummation. Al-Tabari notes Aisha to have stayed with her parents after the marriage and consummated the relationship at nine years of age since she was young and sexually immature at the time of marriage; however, elsewhere Tabari appears to suggest that she was born during the Jahiliyyah (before 610 C.E), which would translate to an age of about twelve or more at marriage.

In Islamic literature, the young age of her marriage did not draw any significant discourse; nonetheless, Spellberg and Ali find the very mention of her age to be atypical of early Muslim biographers, and hypothesize a connotation to her virginity and religious purity. Her age did not interest later Muslim scholars either, and even went unremarked-upon by medieval and early-modern Christian polemicists. Early Orientalist writers—despite taking a condescending approach towards Muhammad and Islam—did not focus on Aisha's age but instead on Muhammad's engaging in polygamy, the ethics of marrying for political causes, etc. A few, however chose to explain the age-gap—passively and without any condemnation—, citing the contemporary understanding of the Orient as a hot place, that promulgated sexually deviant practices.

Beginning in the late nineteenth century, with the East and its alleged immoralities subject to increasing opprobrium, the colonizing powers sought to regulate the age of consent. As such efforts ran into conflicts with local forms of Sharia, pointers to Aisha's age at marriage (and the associated Prophetic precedent) proliferated across the archives in explaining the backwardness of Muslim societies and their reticence to reforms. In response, some Muslims chose to align themselves with the projects of modernization and re-calculated her age—using deft stratagems of omission and commission—to fix it at early adolescence, but conservatives rejected such revisionist readings since they flew in the face of ʻilm al-ḥadīth.

In the mid-20th century, amidst growing concerns of Islamic extremism, as Muslim societies and Islam itself came under scrutiny, pointed criticisms of Aisha's young age at marriage began to appear; this has since prompted many Muslim scholars to contextualize the traditionally accepted age of Aisha with renewed vigor, emphasizing cultural relativism, anachronism, the political dimensions of the marriage, Aisha's non-ordinary physique, etc. In the late-twentieth century and early twenty-first century, Aisha's age has become a tool of polemicists to accuse Muhammad of pedophilia—not as a diagnostic category but as the highest category of evil—and reason for the apparently higher prevalence of child marriage in Muslim societies, among other ills.

Personal life

Relationship with Muhammad

In most Muslim traditions, Khadija bint Khuwaylid is described as Muhammad's most beloved and favored wife; Sunni tradition places Aisha as second only to Khadija. There are several hadiths, or stories or sayings of Muhammad, that support this belief. One relates that when a companion asked Muhammad, "who is the person you love most in the world?" he responded, "Aisha." Others relate that Muhammad built Aisha's apartment so that her door opened directly into the mosque, and that she was the only woman with whom Muhammad received revelations. They bathed in the same water and he prayed while she lay stretched out in front of him.

Various traditions reveal the mutual affection between Muhammad and Aisha. He would often just sit and watch her and her friends play with dolls, and on occasion, he would even join them. Additionally, they were close enough that each was able to discern the mood of the other, as many stories relate. It is also important to note that there exists evidence that Muhammad did not view himself as entirely superior to Aisha, at least not enough to prevent Aisha from speaking her mind, even at the risk of angering Muhammad. On one such instance, Muhammad's "announcement of a revelation permitting him to enter into marriages disallowed to other men drew from her [Aisha] the retort, 'It seems to me your Lord hastens to satisfy your desire!'" Furthermore, Muhammad and Aisha had a strong intellectual relationship. Muhammad valued her keen memory and intelligence and so instructed his companions to draw some of their religious practices from her.

Aisha was jealous of Khadija bint Khuwaylid, Muhammad's first wife, saying, "I did not feel jealous of any of the wives of the Prophet as much as I did of Khadija though I did not see her, the Prophet used to mention her very often, and whenever he slaughtered a sheep, he would cut its parts and send them to the women friends of Khadija. When I sometimes said to him, "(You treat Khadija in such a way) as if there is no woman on earth except Khadija," he would say, "Khadija was such-and-such, and from her I had children."

Aisha and Muhammad would often have races with each other, "I had a race with him (the Prophet) and I outstripped him on my feet. When I became fleshy, (again) I raced with him (the Prophet) and he outstripped me. He said: This is for that outstripping."

Accusation of adultery
The story of the accusation of adultery levied against Aisha, also known as the Event of Ifk, can be traced to surah (chapter) An-Nur of the Qur'an. As the story goes, Aisha left her howdah in order to search for a missing necklace. Her slaves mounted the howdah and prepared it for travel without noticing any difference in weight without Aisha's presence. Hence the caravan accidentally departed without her. She remained at the camp until the next morning, when Safwan ibn al-Mu‘attal, a nomad and member of Muhammad's army, found her and brought her back to Muhammad at the army's next camp. Rumours that Aisha and Safwan had committed adultery were spread, particularly by Abd-Allah ibn Ubayy, Hassan ibn Thabit, Mistah ibn Uthatha and Hammanah bint Jahsh (sister of Zaynab bint Jahsh, another of Muhammad's wives). Usama ibn Zayd, son of Zayd ibn Harithah, defended Aisha's reputation; while Ali ibn Abi Talib advised: "Women are plentiful, and you can easily change one for another." Muhammad came to speak directly with Aisha about the rumours. He was still sitting in her house when he announced that he had received a revelation from God confirming Aisha's innocence. Surah 24 details the Islamic laws and punishment regarding adultery and slander. Aisha's accusers were subjected to punishments of 80 lashes.

Story of the honey
After the daily Asr prayer, Muhammad would visit each of his wives' apartments to inquire about their well-being. Muhammad was just in the amount of time he spent with them and attention he gave to them. Once, Muhammad's fifth wife, Zaynab bint Jahsh, received some honey from a relative which Muhammad took a particular liking to. As a result, every time Zaynab offered some of this honey to him he would spend a long time in her apartment. This did not sit well with Aisha and Hafsa bint Umar.

Soon after this event, Muhammad reported that he had received a revelation in which he was told that he could eat anything permitted by God. Some Sunni commentators on the Qur'an sometimes give this story as the "occasion of revelation" for At-Tahrim, which opens with the following verses:  Word spread to the small Muslim community that Muhammad's wives were speaking sharply to him and conspiring against him. Muhammad, saddened and upset, separated from his wives for a month. ‘Umar, Hafsa's father, scolded his daughter and also spoke to Muhammad of the matter. By the end of this time, his wives were humbled; they agreed to "speak correct and courteous words" and to focus on the afterlife.

Death of Muhammad
Aisha remained Muhammad's favorite wife throughout his life. When he became ill and suspected that he was probably going to die, he began to ask his wives whose apartment he was to stay in next. They eventually figured out that he was trying to determine when he was due with Aisha, and they then allowed him to retire there. He remained in Aisha's apartment until his death, and his last breath was taken as he lay in the arms of Aisha, his second most beloved wife.

Political career
After Muhammad's death, which ended Aisha and Muhammad's 14-year-long marriage, Aisha lived fifty more years in and around Medina. Much of her time was spent learning and acquiring knowledge of the Quran and the sunnah of Muhammad. Aisha was one of three wives (the other two being Hafsa bint Umar and Umm Salama) who memorized the Qur'an. Like Hafsa, Aisha had her script of the Quran written after Muhammad's death. During Aisha's life many prominent customs of Islam, such as veiling of women, began.

Aisha's importance to revitalizing the Arab tradition and leadership among the Arab women highlights her magnitude within Islam. Aisha became involved in the politics of early Islam and the first three caliphate reigns: Abu Bakr, ‘Umar, and ‘Uthman. During a time in Islam when women were not expected or wanted, to contribute outside the household, Aisha delivered public speeches, became directly involved in a war and even battles, and helped both men and women to understand the practices of Muhammad.

Role during caliphate

Role during first and second caliphates
After Muhammad's death in 632, Abu Bakr was appointed as the first caliph. This matter of succession to Muhammad is extremely controversial to the Shia who believe that Ali had been appointed by Muhammad to lead while Sunni maintain that the public elected Abu Bakr. Abu Bakr had two advantages in achieving his new role: his long personal friendship with Muhammad and his role as a father-in-law. As caliph, Abu Bakr was the first to set guidelines for the new position of authority.

Aisha garnered more special privileges in the Islamic community for being known as both a wife of Muhammad and the daughter of the first caliph. Being the daughter of Abu Bakr tied Aisha to honorable titles earned from her father's strong dedication to Islam. For example, she was given the title of al-siddiqa bint al-Siddiq, meaning 'the truthful woman, daughter of the truthful man', a reference to Abu Bakr's support of the Isra and Mi'raj.

In 634 Abu Bakr fell sick and was unable to recover. Before his death, he appointed ‘Umar, one of his chief advisers, as the second caliph. Throughout ‘Umar's time in power Aisha continued to play the role of a consultant in political matters.

Role during the third caliphate
After ‘Umar died, ‘Uthmān was chosen to be the third caliph. He wanted to promote the interests of the Umayyads. Aisha had little involvement with ‘Uthmān for the first couple years, but eventually, she found a way into the politics of his reign. She eventually grew to despise ‘Uthmān, and many are unsure of what specifically triggered her eventual opposition towards him. A prominent opposition that arose towards him was when ‘Uthmān mistreated ‘Ammar ibn Yasir (companion of Muhammad) by beating him. Aisha became enraged and spoke out publicly, saying, "How soon indeed you have forgotten the practice (sunnah) of your prophet and these, his hairs, a shirt, and sandal have not yet perished!".

As time continued issues of antipathy towards ‘Uthmān continued to arise. Another instance of opposition arose when the people came to Aisha after Uthmān ignored the rightful punishment for Walid ibn Uqbah (Uthmān's brother). Aisha and Uthmān argued with each other, Uthmān eventually commented on why Aisha had come and how she was "ordered to stay at home". Arising from this comment, was the question of whether Aisha and for that matter women, still could be involved in public affairs. The Muslim community became split: "some sided with Uthmān, but others demanded to know who indeed had a better right than Aisha in such matters".

The caliphate took a turn for the worse when Egypt was governed by Abdullah ibn Saad. Abbott reports that Muhammad ibn Abi Hudhayfa of Egypt, an opponent of ‘Uthmān, forged letters in the Mothers of the Believers' names to the conspirators against ‘Uthmān. The people cut off ‘Uthmān's water and food supply. When Aisha realized the behavior of the crowd, Abbott notes, Aisha could not believe the crowd "would offer such indignities to a widow of Mohammad". This refers to when Safiyya bint Huyayy (one of Muhammad's wives) tried to help ‘Uthmān and was taken by the crowd. Malik al-Ashtar then approached her about killing Uthmān and the letter, and she claimed she would never want to "command the shedding of the blood of the Muslims and the killing of their Imām"; she also claimed she did not write the letters. The city continued to oppose ‘Uthmān, but as for Aisha, her journey to Mecca was approaching. With the journey to Mecca approaching at this time, she wanted to rid herself of the situation. ‘Uthmān heard of her not wanting to hurt him, and he asked her to stay because she influenced the people, but this did not persuade Aisha, and she continued on her journey.

First Fitna

In 655, Uthman's house was put under siege by about 1000 rebels. Eventually the rebels broke into the house and murdered Uthman, provoking the First Fitna. After killing Uthman, the rebels asked Ali to be the new caliph, although Ali was not involved in the murder of Uthman according to many reports. Ali reportedly initially refused the caliphate, agreeing to rule only after his followers persisted.

When Ali could not execute those merely accused of Uthman's murder, Aisha delivered a fiery speech against him for not avenging the death of Uthman. The first to respond to Aisha was Abdullah ibn Aamar al-Hadhrami, the governor of Mecca during the reign of Uthman, and prominent members of the Banu Umayya. With the funds from the "Yemeni Treasury" Aisha set out on a campaign against the Rashidun Caliphate of Ali.

Aisha, along with an army including Zubayr ibn al-Awwam and Talha ibn Ubayd Allah, confronted Ali's army, demanding the prosecution of Uthman's killers who had mingled with his army outside the city of Basra. When her forces captured Basra she ordered the execution of 600 Muslims and 40 others, including Hakim ibn Jabala, who were put to death in the Grand Mosque of Basra. Aisha's forces are also known to have tortured and imprisoned Uthman ibn Hunaif a Sahabi and the governor of Basra appointed by Ali.

Ali rallied supporters and fought Aisha's forces near Basra in 656. The battle is known as the Battle of the Camel, after the fact that Aisha directed her forces from a howdah on the back of a large camel. Aisha's forces were defeated and an estimated 10,000 Muslims were killed in the battle, considered the first engagement where Muslims fought Muslims.

After 110 days of the conflict, Ali met Aisha with reconciliation. He sent her back to Medina under military escort headed by her brother Muhammad ibn Abi Bakr, one of Ali's commanders. She subsequently retired to Medina with no more interference with the affairs of the state. She was also awarded a pension by Ali.

Although she retired to Medina, her forsaken efforts against the Rashidun Caliphate of Ali did not end the First Fitna.

Contributions to Islam and influence
After 25 years of a monogamous relationship with his first wife, Khadija bint Khuwaylid, Muhammad participated in nine years of polygyny, marrying at least nine further wives. Muhammad's subsequent marriages were depicted purely as political matches rather than unions of sexual indulgence. In particular, Muhammad's unions with Aisha and Hafsa bint Umar associated him with two of the most significant leaders of the early Muslim community, Aisha's and Hafsa's fathers, Abu Bakr and ‘Umar ibn al-Khattāb, respectively.

Aisha's marriage has given her significance among many within Islamic culture, becoming known as the most learned woman of her time. Being Muhammad's favorite wife, Aisha occupied an important position in his life. When Muhammad married Aisha in her youth, she was accessible "...to the values needed to lead and influence the sisterhood of Muslim women." After the death of Muhammad, Aisha was discovered to be a renowned source of hadiths, due to her qualities of intelligence and memory. Aisha conveyed ideas expressing Muhammad's practice (sunnah). She expressed herself as a role model to women, which can also be seen within some traditions attributed to her. The traditions regarding Aisha habitually opposed ideas unfavorable to women in efforts to elicit social change.

According to Reza Aslan:

Not only was Aisha supportive of Muhammad, but she contributed scholarly intellect to the development of Islam. She was given the title al-Siddiqah, meaning 'the one who affirms the truth'. Aisha was known for her "...expertise in the Quran, shares of inheritance, lawful and unlawful matters, poetry, Arabic literature, Arab history, genealogy, and general medicine." Her intellectual contributions regarding the verbal texts of Islam were in time transcribed into written form, becoming the official history of Islam. After the death of Muhammad, Aisha was regarded as the most reliable source in the teachings of hadith. Aisha's authentication of Muhammad's ways of prayer and his recitation of the Qur'an allowed for the development of knowledge of his sunnah of praying and reading verses of the Quran.

During Aisha's entire life she was a strong advocate for the education of Islamic women, especially in law and the teachings of Islam. She was known for establishing the first madrasa for women in her home. Attending Aisha's classes were various family relatives and orphaned children. Men also attended Aisha's classes, with a simple curtain separating the male and female students.

Political influence
Spellberg argues that Aisha's political influence helped promote her father, Abu Bakr, to the caliphate after Muhammad's death.

After the defeat at the Battle of the Camel, Aisha retreated to Medina and became a teacher. Upon her arrival in Medina, Aisha retired from her public role in politics. Her discontinuation of public politics did not stop her political influence completely. Privately, Aisha continued influencing those intertwined in the Islamic political sphere. Among the Islamic community, she was known as an intelligent woman who debated law with male companions. Aisha was also considered to be the embodiment of proper rituals while partaking in the pilgrimage to Mecca, a journey she made with several groups of women. For the last two years of her life, Aisha spent much of her time telling the stories of Muhammad, hoping to correct false passages that had become influential in formulating Islamic law. Due to this, Aisha's political influence continues to impact those in Islam.

Death
Aisha died at her home in Medina on 17 Ramadan 58 AH (16 July 678). She was 67 years old. Abu Hurairah led her funeral prayer after the tahajjud (night) prayer, and she was buried at Jannat al-Baqi‘.

Views

Sunni view of Aisha
Sunnis believe she was Muhammad's favorite wife after Khadija bint Khuwaylid. They consider her (among other wives) to be Umm al-Mu’minin and among the members of the Ahl al-Bayt, or Muhammad's family. According to Sunni hadith reports, Muhammad saw Aisha in two dreams in which he was shown that he would marry her.

Shia view of Aisha

The Shia view Aisha is different than Sunni. They criticize her for opposing Ali during his caliphate in the Battle of the Camel, when she fought men from Ali's army in Basra.

See also

 List of people related to Quranic verses
 Muhammad's wives
 The Jewel of Medina (fictional work based loosely on Aisha's existence)

References

Notes

Citations

Sources

 
 
 
 
 
 
 
 
 
 

 
 
 
 
 
  Read online

Further reading

 
 
 
 
 
  (translated from the French by Anne Carter)

610s births
678 deaths
7th-century Arabs
7th-century women
People of the Quran
Arab women
Arab princesses
Children of Rashidun caliphs
Abu Bakr family
Child marriage
Wives of Muhammad
Women in medieval warfare
Women in war in the Middle East
Muslim female saints
Angelic visionaries
People of the First Fitna
Women companions of the Prophet
Burials at Jannat al-Baqī
Arab women in war